The 2010 Claxton Shield is the 76th edition of the premier baseball competition in Australia, contested between teams representing the five mainland states: New South Wales Patriots, Queensland Rams, defending champions Perth Heat (representing the state of Western Australia), South Australia and Victoria Aces.

Prior to the start of the competition, each team nominated 30 players that would be eligible to play over the course of the season. As the season progressed, injuries forced some players to be replaced in these 30–man squads. In addition, some players under contract to Major League Baseball teams and their minor league affiliates were declared unavailable. During each series of the season, teams nominated a 19–player roster of active players. Only players on the active roster could participate in a game.

New South Wales Patriots
The New South Wales Patriots announced on 4 November 2009 both their 30–man roster and their 19–man roster for the opening series of the season.

Queensland Rams

Perth Heat

South Australia

Victoria Aces

See also
2010 Claxton Shield
Australian Baseball Federation

References

External links
2010 Claxton Shield - Official Tournament Website
Official Baseball Australia Website

team rosters